Neocondeellum is a genus of proturans in the family Protentomidae, found in China, Japan, and North America.

Species
 Neocondeellum americanum Bernard, 1985
 Neocondeellum brachytarsum (Yin, 1977)
 Neocondeellum chrysalis (Imadaté & Yin, 1979)
 Neocondeellum dolichotarsum (Yin, 1977)
 Neocondeellum japonicum Nakamura, 1990
 Neocondeellum matobai (Imadaté, 1974)
 Neocondeellum minusculum Nakamura, 1990
 Neocondeellum wuyanense Yin & Imadaté, 1991
 Neocondeellum yinae Zhang, 1987

References

Protura